The Warwick Prize for Women in Translation, established in 2017, is an annual prize honoring a translated work by a female author published in English by a UK-based or Irish publisher during the previous calendar year. The stated aim of the prize is "to address the gender imbalance in translated literature and to increase the number of international women’s voices accessible by a British and Irish readership." The prize is open to works of fiction, poetry, or literary non-fiction, or works of fiction for children or young adults. Only works written by a woman are eligible; the gender of the translator is immaterial. The £1,000 prize is divided evenly between the author and her translator(s), or goes entirely to the translator(s) in cases where the writer is no longer living. The prize is funded and administered by the University of Warwick.

Awards

2022 
The 2022 shortlist for the Warwick Prize for Women in Translation. The joint winners were announced on 24 November 2022.

2021 
The 2021 shortlist for the Warwick Prize for Women in Translation was announced by the University of Warwick on 10 November 2021. The winner was announced on 24 November 2021.

In 2021, a runner-up prize was also awarded: this went to Strange Beasts of China by Yan Ge, translated by Jeremy Tiang.

2020 
The 2020 shortlist for the Warwick Prize for Women in Translation was announced by the University of Warwick on 11 November 2020. The winner was announced on 26 November 2020.

In 2020, a runner-up prize was also awarded: this went to Letters from Tove by Tove Jansson, translated by Sarah Death.

2019 
The 2019 shortlist for the Warwick Prize for Women in Translation was announced by the University of Warwick on 28 October 2019. The winner was announced on 20 November 2019.

2018 
The 2018 shortlist for the Warwick Prize for Women in Translation was announced by the University of Warwick. The 2018 winner is in yellow.

2017 
The 2017 prize was announced in a ceremony at the Warwick Arts Centre on Nov. 15, 2017. The judging panel was composed of Susan Bassnett, Amanda Hopkinson, and Boyd Tonkin, Special Adviser, Man Booker International Prize. The winner is in yellow.

See also

 List of literary awards honoring women

References

English literary awards
British fiction awards
Poetry awards
Children's literary awards
Translation awards
Literary awards honoring women
Awards established in 2017
2017 establishments in the United Kingdom
University of Warwick